Gaël Sanz (born 1 May 1977 in Charleville-Mézières) is a French former professional footballer who played as a defender. 

He joined Ligue 1 side Troyes AC in the summer of 2002 from AS Beauvais and spent nine seasons playing for the club.

External links
 Gaël Sanz's Profile at LFP.fr

1977 births
Living people
French footballers
Ligue 1 players
Ligue 2 players
Lille OSC players
AS Beauvais Oise players
ES Troyes AC players

Association football defenders
People from Charleville-Mézières
Sportspeople from Ardennes (department)
France youth international footballers
Footballers from Grand Est